10cm is a South Korean musical act currently composed of singer-songwriter Kwon Jung-yeol.

Originally a duo composed of Kwon and Yoon Cheol-jong, 10cm debuted in 2010. With the release of the single "Americano," the group quickly became one of the most popular indie acts in South Korea, winning the This Year's Discovery Award at the 2010 Mnet Asian Music Awards, followed by Best Pop Song at the 2011 Korean Music Awards. Their first full-length album, 1.0 (2011) sold 30,000 copies, a record for an indie act at the time. Following a slew of successful singles, and the release of the full-length albums 2.0 (2012) and 3.0 (2014), the group achieved its first number-one hit on the Gaon Digital Chart in 2016 with the single "What the Spring??".

Yoon left the group in July 2017 while facing charges for marijuana use. Kwon has continued to promote as a solo artist under the name 10cm, releasing the album 4.0 in September 2017 and several singles, including the Gaon Digital Chart top-ten hits "Mattress" (2018), "However" (2019), and "Borrow Your Night" (2021). His concert "Hotel room 1010" (2020) is the first paid online concert of Korean non-idol artist.

Career

Pre-debut
Kwon and Yoon were both from Gumi, North Gyeongsang. When Yoon was in his first year of high school, he was part of a school band club called 'Mad Pulse', and Jeongyeol (who was in middle school at the time) brought a letter and a recorded tape of his work to Yoon to ask him if he can join the band. As Jeongyeol gained some local fame with his singing skills, Kwon was finally allowed to perform in Yoon's band. Because of this inclusion of Kwon to the team, Yoon (originally a vocalist) decided to take his position in the band as a guitarist to make room for Kwon. Kwon and Yoon formed the band 'Haeryeong (해령,海靈)' in Daegu in 2004. After enlisting in the South Korean military, the two formed the band 'Seven Hills' named after the army unit they served in, called 'Chilbong'.

Birth of 10cm as a band
Around 2008 or 2009, the two arrived in Seoul to venture into the indie scene. The band debuted as a indie band at 'Club ta (打)', a famous live club located in Hongdae.

2010–2011: Debut and 1.0
Their debut EP, which was released in April 2010, was recorded with a microphone covered in stockings and the album cover was 100% made by themselves and 3000 copies were published. The album was sold out in one month, and the band gained popularity. In 2011, the band released their first studio album 1.0. The band describe the music in the album was targeted towards office women in their late 20s to their 30s, and seek their empathies, which was a contrast to their early music, but gained popularity for their brutally honest and sensual lyrics. The first 10,000 copies were sold out on the release day. The band's early activities involved playing the djembe which was influenced from performances of Jason Mraz and Toca Rivera.

2012–2017: 2.0 and 3.0
The band released 2.0 in 2012. The band tried to create an adult-oriented sound that reminds them of the 1960s, that would resemble the vibe of Let It Be by the Beatles, which was widely contrasting to the band's refined production in their debut album. Also while the production on 1.0 was minimalistic, the range of different instruments used on 2.0 increased, and different genres such as modern rock and tango were also explored. 3.0 was released in 2014, and the vocal parts for Cheol-jong increased compared to the previous albums.

2017–present: Yoon's departure and future career
In June 2017, Yoon suddenly announced to departure from the group, which was later revealed to be a decision made by Yoon to not disturb his bandmate Kwon by Yoon's legal troubles related with Yoon smoking Marijuana, which led to 10cm becoming a one man band. In September 2017, the release of 4.0 was announced.

Philanthropy 
On March 9, 2022, Kwon donated  million to the Hope Bridge Disaster Relief Association to help the victims of the massive wildfires that started in Uljin, Gyeongbuk, and also spread to Samcheok, Gangwon.On October 12, Kwon donated fees from the university festival performance to Yonsei University where he is an alumni.

Members

Kwon Jung-yeol (권정열) – main vocal, percussion, guitar
Yoon Cheol-jong (윤철종) – vocal, guitar, tambourine (2009-2017)

Discography

Studio albums

Extended plays

Singles

Singles as featured artist

Soundtrack appearances

Other charted songs

Awards and nominations

Concerts
 2013.02.23 "Fine thank you and you?", the Olympic Gymnastics Stadium, Korea. 
 2014.01.31 '부루다콘서트 VER1. "Hello 10cm", LA, the United States.
2020.10.10 "Hotel room 1010", kakaoTV, Korea.

Notes

References

External links
 Cyworld  

South Korean indie rock groups
Musical groups established in 2009
Korean Music Award winners
Melon Music Award winners
2009 establishments in South Korea